Snow Hill Township is an inactive township in Lincoln County, in the U.S. state of Missouri.

Snow Hill Township was established in 1875.

References

Townships in Missouri
Townships in Lincoln County, Missouri